Paul Dissard (1852–1926) was a French art historian, a specialist of Gallo-Roman culture. An epigrapher and curator at the Museum of Fine Arts of Lyon, he contributed with Auguste Allmer to change a fledgling science by confronting archaeological evidence and providing a reference documentation.

Publications 
 Articles
 Quelques médailles romaines inédites, Gobbaerts, Brussels, 1880, 7 p.
 Jetons des Compagnies de chevaliers - Tireurs de Lyon au XVIIIe siècle, 7 p., in Lyon-Revue n° 2, A. Storck impr., Lyon, July 1880.
 Notice sur la confrérie des Pénitents de Notre-Dame du Confalon, in Lyon-Revue n° 6, 7, 8, 10 & 11, A. Storck impr., Lyon, December, January, February, April and May 1881.
 Épigraphie lyonnaise - Inscriptions funéraires de la rue de Trion, 7 p, in Lyon-Revue n° 21, A. Storck impr., Lyon, 30 September 1882.
 With A. Vingtrinier, Épigraphie lyonnaise. Inscriptions funéraires de la Rue de Trion. Lettre au sujet de deux inscriptions lyonnaises du Musée de Lyon, collect° Opuscules lyonnais n° 4, H. Georg, Lyon, 1883, 23 p.
 With Émile Espérandieu, Ain - Calendrier de Coligny, Saint-Maixent, 1898.
 Additions et corrections au texte de l'inscription gauloise trouvée à Coligny, Ain, Imprimerie nationale, Paris, Lyon, 1898, 48 p.
 .
 Epigraphie, in coll. "Comité local du Congrès de Lyon 1906 - Association française pour l'avancement des sciences", Les Musées de Lyon, pp. 36–49, A. Rey & cie. impr., Lyon, 1906.
 Coll., Histoire des églises et chapelles de Lyon, Librairie Roux & H. Lardanchet, Lyon, 1908 & 1909, 2 vol.

 Catalogues
 with Auguste Allmer, Trion : antiquités découvertes en 1885 et antérieurement au quartier de Lyon dit de Trion, Association typographique, Lyon, 1887,
 réed. Baillière, Paris, 1898, 2 vol.
 Les inscriptions antiques du Musée des beaux-arts de Lyon, L. Delaroche & cie., Lyon, 1888-1893, 5 vol., 2237 p.
 Peinture moderne, in Catalogue sommaire des musées de la Ville de Lyon, Museum of Fine Arts of Lyon, Lyon, 1899.
 Sculpture moderne, in Catalogue sommaire des musées de la Ville de Lyon, Musée des beaux-arts de Lyon, Lyon, 1899.
 Catalogue des plombs antiques - Collection Récamier : sceaux, tessères, monnaies, objets divers., Rollin, Paris, 1905, 328 p.
 Les musées de Lyon : peinture, sculpture, art antique, épigraphie, sigillographie, Moyen Âge, Renaissance, Lyon, 1906,
 reprint Le Musée de Lyon. Les peintures, H. Laurens, Paris, 1912, 72 p.
 reprint Nabu Press, Charleston, South Carolina, May 2010.

See also 
 Coligny calendar
 Museum of Fine Arts of Lyon

External links 

 Paul Dissard on data.bnf.fr
 Antiquités de Coligny (Ain) communiquées par M. Paul Dissard on Persée

1852 births
1926 deaths
People from Lyon
French art historians
French epigraphers
20th-century French historians
21st-century French historians